Samuel Badger (December 6, 1786 – March 14, 1866) was an American politician.

Badger was born in Windham, Connecticut, December 6, 1786.  He graduated from Yale College in 1805. He read law in the office of Jared Ingersoll, Esq., of Philadelphia, and was admitted to the bar in 1809. Notwithstanding his youth, he received in 1814, from Governor Simon Snyder, the appointment of Associate Judge of the Court of Common Pleas. He retained this office but little more than a year, accepting from the same Governor the office of Alderman, which he held for twenty-five years.  He died in Philadelphia, March 14, 1866, aged 79 years.  He left a widow.

1786 births
1866 deaths
People from Windham, Connecticut
Yale College alumni
Pennsylvania lawyers
Pennsylvania local politicians
19th-century American politicians
19th-century American lawyers